FMW Productions was the name of a Japanese record label of professional wrestling promotion Frontier Martial-Arts Wrestling (FMW), which produced many compilation albums consisting of theme songs of wrestlers on the FMW roster during the promotion's existence between 1991 and 2001.

Last Fight

Last Fight was the first compilation album by Frontier Martial-Arts Wrestling (FMW), which was produced and released in 1994. The album was recorded shortly after Atsushi Onita lost his match to Genichiro Tenryu at 5th Anniversary Show on May 5, 1994, forcing him to retire at the following year's 6th Anniversary Show. The album was released on July 21, 1994 and consisted of various FMW theme songs and clips of Atsushi Onita's retirement press conference on May 9, 1994 as well as his acclaimed messages with Genichiro Tenryu from 5th Anniversary Show and Tarzan Goto at the 1990 Summer Spectacular and the 2nd Anniversary Show.

Track listing
Retirement Press Conference (May 9, 1994)
Atsushi Onita – "Wild Thing" by X
Mune-ippai No Puroresu Jinsei	
Encounter With Wrestling	
Return First Round ~ FMW Raising An Army Decision	
FMW Raising An Army	
Barbed Wire	
Shiodome ~ Norobu Barbed Wire Deathmatch	
FMW 1st Anniversary Show
The Meaning Of A Flame and Mine Deathmatch	
Atsushi Onita vs. Tarzan Goto at FMW 2nd Anniversary Show	
Zasetsu To Fukkatsu	
Atsushi Onita vs. Genichiro Tenryu at FMW 5th Anniversary Show	
To The Next Generation	
Message To The Fans	
Mune-ippai Ni Dakishimete	
Current Blast Sound	
Timed Blast Sound

Phoenix: FMW Official Theme Song CD 1st

Phoenix: FMW Official Theme Song CD 1st was the second compilation album by FMW which featured various versions of theme songs of Hayabusa and various FMW theme songs.

Track listing

Theme of the F: FMW Official Theme Song CD 2nd

Dead or Alive: FMW Official Theme Song 2nd was the third compilation album by Frontier Martial-Arts Wrestling, featuring theme songs of FMW wrestlers. The album was released on June 26, 1996.

Track listing

Dead or Alive: FMW Official Theme Song CD 3rd

Dead or Alive: FMW Official Theme Song 3rd was the fourth compilation album by Frontier Martial-Arts Wrestling, featuring theme songs of various FMW wrestlers. The album was released on September 26, 1997.

Track listing

FMW Entertainment Music - Official Theme Song CD Best

FMW Entertainment Music - Official Theme Song CD Best was the fifth and final compilation album of Frontier Martial-Arts Wrestling featuring new theme songs of wrestlers as well as a few theme songs which had been featured in the previous albums as well.

Track listing

References

Frontier Martial-Arts Wrestling
1990s compilation albums
Rock compilation albums
Professional wrestling albums
Professional wrestling-related mass media
Professional wrestling-related lists
J-pop compilation albums
Japanese record labels